Indian Cement Company Ground, also known as ICL Sankar Nagar Cricket Ground is a cricket ground located in Tirunelveli in Tamil Nadu, India. The ground is in Bala Vidyalaya School run by India Cements. It is adjacent to the NH 44 in the village of Thaliyuthu.

From 2016, the ground has been used for hosting Tamil Nadu Premier League (TNPL) matches. As of 2020, it has hosted eight first-class and two List A cricket matches.

Facilities 
The ground has a seating capacity of 4,000. It was increased from the 3,400 after addition of two more stands in July 2017. The ground also has dressing rooms, media and commentary boxes. The ground uses up to 60 per cent recycled water from sewage treatment plants for pitch maintenance due to low rainfall in the region.

Safety measures 
In 2017, a petition was filed with the High court's Madurai bench against the TNPL matches being held in the ground citing safety hazards. The reasons cited were proximity to accident-prone National Highway 44 with only one entrance. However, the court refused it while directing officials to ensure adequate infrastructure and safety measures at the ground. By July 2017, Tamil Nadu Cricket Association had erected up to 8 gates to ensure safe entrance and exit of the spectators, increased the height of the walls and set up roofs for the VIP gallery. The public gallery were still unroofed. Matches were held at the ground thereafter without any halt.

See also 

 NPR College Ground
 Guru Nanak College Ground
 Salem Cricket Foundation Stadium

References

External links 
 Indian Cement Company Ground at Cricinfo
 Indian Cement Company Ground at CricketArchive

Cricket grounds in Tamil Nadu
Sports venues in Tamil Nadu
Year of establishment missing